Alfredo Bogarín (born 31 July 1936) is a Paraguayan fencer. He competed in the individual épée event at the 1988 Summer Olympics.

References

External links
 

1936 births
Living people
Paraguayan male épée fencers
Olympic fencers of Paraguay
Fencers at the 1988 Summer Olympics
20th-century Paraguayan people